The Goethe–Schiller Monument is a public artwork by German artist Ernst Friedrich August Rietschel located in Washington Park, which is in Milwaukee, Wisconsin, United States. The bronze sculpture from 1908 depicts two men, Johann Wolfgang von Goethe and Friedrich von Schiller, one holding a laurel wreath and the other a scroll. The 12 foot artwork rests upon a 26 foot long granite base. The bronze sculpture is a recasting of the statue incorporated into the 1857 Goethe-Schiller Monument in Weimar, Germany.

Description
The Goethe-Schiller Monument consists of two men standing side by side. One of the men, Johann Wolfgang von Goethe passes a laurel wreath to the younger man, Friedrich von Schiller, who holds a scroll in his proper left hand. Goethe is attired in a knee-length coat, a shirt with a ruffled collar, a vest and leggings. Schiller is attired in a mid-calf length coat, a vest and leggings. The sculpture stands atop a tiered granite base containing an exedra. The sculpture has three inscriptions. On the lowest left side of the sculpture it says: RIETSCHEL, ERNEST F. On the front of the plinth, in incised letters, it says: GOETHE SCHILLER. On the front of the base it says: GOETHE SCHILLER. The granite base contains three plaques. The plaque on the left side reads:

 Was Du ererbt von Deinen
 Vätern hast Erwirb es,
 um es zu besitzen

 Johann Wolfgang von Goethe
 1749–1832
 Weltbürger – World Citizen

These are lines from Goethe’s Faust I.i, "That which you inherit from your fathers / You must earn in order to possess."—Goethe’s Faust, trans. Randall Jarrell, p. 35 (1976).

The plaque on the right side reads:

 Wer nichts waget
 der darf nichts hoffen

 Friedrich von Schiller
 1759–1805

These lines are from  Schiller's Wallenstein: "Who dares nothing, need hope for nothing."

The plaque in the center reads:

 Erected by the German Citizens of Wisconsin
 and dedicated to the city-June 14, 1908
 Rededicated September 4, 1960
 German-American Societies of Milwaukee, Wisconsin

 Johann Wolfgang von Goethe's 250th birthday
 August 28, 1749
 celebrated on August 1, 1999 by the 
 German-American Societies of Milwaukee, Wisconsin

The Goethe-Schiller Monument is administered by the Milwaukee County, Department of Parks, Recreation and Culture.

Historical information
Johann Wolfgang von Goethe and Friedrich von Schiller were both highly influential German poets, dramatists and writers that became friends in Weimar, Thuringia. The Germans that came to the United States after 1848, as well as the German thinkers who came after 1870, brought Goethe and Schiller's ideas with them.

Originally, the Milwaukee Swabian Benevolent Society wanted to erect a monument to Schiller, a fellow Swabian, but other Milwaukee German societies wanted to participate in the monument's creation. In 1902 thirty organizations and various private donors, including local families such as the Vogels, Brumders, and Nunnemachers, formed a monument association to raise funds for the artwork. They raised $10,000 for the monument and $5,000 for the pedestal. "In 1908, a coalition of German groups had little trouble agreeing that Germania in Milwaukee should be represented by a copy of the bronze statue created by artist Ernest Rietschel for the front of the Dresden Court Theater in Weimar, Saxony. The larger community was quick to accept the monument." The Milwaukee monument was thus cast by the foundry in Lauchhammer, Germany from Rietschel's original 1857 mold.

The monument was dedicated on June 12, 1908 as part of a great celebration that included thousands of people singing and reading Goethe's and Schiller's works, a dedication speech by Christian Steger, and a gymnastics demonstration. The monument had to be moved from its previous location in Washington Park to its current location west of the Emil Blatz Temple of Music in 1960 because of Highway 41's location. The rededication ceremonies took place on September 1, 1960. A time capsule that had been placed in the base of the monument was found. It contained both German and English newspapers and magazines, records of the Schiller-Goethe Association and copies of the Milwaukee Journal Sentinel and Social Democratic Herald.

There are four Goethe-Schiller Monuments in the United States, each incorporating a copy of Rietschel's 1857 bronze in Weimar. In addition to Milwaukee, they are in San Francisco (1901), Cleveland (1907), and Syracuse (1911).

References

External links

 Goethe-Schiller Monument, Greetings from Milwaukee, UWM Archives

1908 establishments in Wisconsin
1908 sculptures
Articles containing video clips
Bronze sculptures in Wisconsin
Cultural depictions of Friedrich Schiller
Cultural depictions of Johann Wolfgang von Goethe
Monuments and memorials in Wisconsin
Outdoor sculptures in Milwaukee
Sculptures of men in Wisconsin
Statues in Wisconsin
Statues of writers